Group Captain Thomas Loel Evelyn Bulkeley Guinness,  (9 June 1906 – 31 December 1988) was a British Conservative politician, Member of Parliament (MP) for Bath (1931–1945), business magnate and philanthropist. Guinness also financed the purchase of the Calypso, leasing her for one symbolic franc a year to famous oceanic explorer Jacques-Yves Cousteau and his movie The Silent World (1956).

Early life

Born in Manhattan and raised in the United States and England, Loel Guinness was the only son of Benjamin Seymour Guinness (1868–1947), an Irish lawyer from whom he inherited a fortune, and his first wife, Bridget Henrietta Frances Williams-Bulkeley (d. 1931). His father remarried with an Italian Duchess ( Maria Nunziante, suo jure Duchess) and was made (22 May 1946) a Prince (life title) by the King of Italy. He descended from Samuel Guinness, a Dublin goldsmith (1727–1795) and younger brother of the Guinness brewery's founder Arthur Guinness.

Loel Guinness also had two sisters: Meraud Michelle Wemyss Guinness (1904–1993), who married Alvaro Guevara (1894–1951) in 1929, and Tanis Eva Bulkeley Guinness (1908–1993), who married three times. Her first husband (m.1931–1937) was The Hon. William Drogo Sturges Montagu, son of George Charles Montagu, 9th Earl of Sandwich; her second husband (m. 1937–1951) was Howard Dietz and her third husband (m.1951) was Lt. Commander Charles Edward Harold John Phillips, who was the paternal uncle of Alexandra Hamilton, Duchess of Abercorn and Natalia Grosvenor, Duchess of Westminster and the first cousin of Janet Mountbatten, Marchioness of Milford Haven).

He was educated at Royal Military College, Sandhurst. He gained the rank of lieutenant in the service of the Irish Guards.

Career
After taking flying lessons, Guinness joined the Royal Aero Club in 1928. The following year, he became one of the first private citizens in England to own an airplane and soon he was a member of the County of London's Auxiliary Air Force squadron. He later served as president of Air Work Ltd., an aircraft-parts supplier, and of British United Airways.

In 1931, on his third try, Guinness was elected to Parliament for Bath and was named parliamentary private secretary to Sir Philip Sassoon, the Under Secretary for Air from 1931 to 1935. He held his seat until 1945, when he stood down.

Second World War
Guinness gained the rank of group captain in the service of the Royal Auxiliary Air Force. When the Second World War broke out in 1939, Guinness went on active duty with the Royal Air Force. In 1940 he flew as a fighter pilot in the Battle of Britain, famously buying a petrol station near his aerodrome when his driving was restricted by rationing. In 1944 he became commander of a wing of the Second Tactical Air Force and by the war's end he had been Mentioned in Despatches five times. He was invested as an Officer of the Order of the British Empire in 1942. The Netherlands made him a Commander of the Order of Orange-Nassau and France made him an Officer of the Legion of Honour and awarded him a Croix de Guerre.

Personal life
Guinness's first marriage was to the Honourable Joan Barbara Yarde-Buller (1908–1997), a daughter of the 3rd Lord Churston. Before their divorce, Loel and Joan had a son, Patrick Benjamin Guinness (1931–1965), who married his stepsister from his father's third marriage, Dolores Maria Agatha Wilhelmine Luise, Freiin von Fürstenberg-Hedringen (1936–2012), on 22 October 1955 in Paris. He was killed weeks before their 10th wedding anniversary in an automobile accident near Rarogne, Switzerland.

At his son's christening on 15 July 1931 at St Margaret's, Westminster, his godparents were Princess Ingrid of Sweden (1910–2000), Richard Francis Roger Yarde-Buller, 4th Baron Churston (1910–1991), Sir Philip Sassoon, 3rd Baronet (1888–1939), Walter Rosen (1875–1951), Judith Blunt-Lytton, 16th Baroness Wentworth (1873–1957), and Mrs. Richard Guinness (née Beatrice Mackay, formerly Mrs. Nico Jungman).

Joan left him for Prince Aly Khan, the eldest son of the Aga Khan III, the 43rd Shia Imam, and Guinness successfully sued Joan and Khan on grounds of adultery. Joan and Khan did not defend the charges and the judge, Justice Bucknill, granted Guinness a decree nisi and full custody of their son and ordered Khan to pay court costs. Joan married Khan on 18 May 1936, a few days after the divorce became absolute. His son Patrick is a half-brother to the present Aga Khan IV. Joan and Khan also divorced and the Prince later married American actress Rita Hayworth, and Joan married the 2nd Viscount Camrose and was styled as Joan Berry, Viscountess Camrose.

In 1936, he married his second wife, Lady Isabel Violet Kathleen Manners (1918–2008), the second daughter of John Manners, 9th Duke of Rutland and Kathleen Tennant. His wife was prominent in society at Palm Beach. Together, they were the parents of a son and a daughter:

 William Loel Seymour Guinness (born 1939), who married Agnes Elizabeth Lynn Day in 1971.
 Serena Belinda Rosemary "Lindy" Guinness (25 March 1941 – 26 October 2020), who married Sheridan Hamilton-Temple-Blackwood, 5th and last Marquess of Dufferin and Ava in 1964, a great-grandson of Edward Guinness, 1st Earl of Iveagh.

In a reversal of the outcome of his first marriage, in 1951, Lady Isabel was granted a divorce after accusing him of adultery, which he did not contest.

On 7 April 1951, he married his third wife, the socialite Gloria Rubio y Alatorre (1913–1980), who had been the wife of Prince Ahmed Fakhry Bey of Egypt, grandson of King Fuad I of Egypt. Her daughter, Dolores married his eldest son, Patrick Benjamin Guinness (1931–1965).

On 31 December 1988, Guinness died of heart disease at The Methodist Hospital in Houston, Texas, United States. He was buried with the remains of his third wife at the Bois-de-Vaux Cemetery, Lausanne.

Descendants

Through his son Patrick and his stepdaughter Dolores, he was the grandfather of Maria Alexandra (born 1956), who married Foulques, Count de Quatrebarbes (born 1948) in 1979, Loel Patrick Guinness (born 1957), and Victoria Christina Guinness (born 1960), who married Philip Niarchos in 1984 (son of late Greek billionaire Stavros Niarchos).

Through his son William, he was the grandfather of Sheridan William Guinness (born 1972), Thomas Seymour Guinness (born 1973), and Chloë Belinda Vane-Tempest-Stewart (born 1976), who married Lord Reginald Alexander Vane-Tempest-Stewart (born 1977).

References
Notes

Sources
 Mosley, Charles, Burke's Peerage and Baronetage, 107th edition, volume 2, page 1695.
 Vickers, Hugo, The Unexpurgated Beaton: The Cecil Beaton Diaries as He Wrote Them, 1970–1980, Knopf, New York, 2003.

External links
 
Obituary: Loel Guinness, 82, R.A.F. Flier And a Socialite on 2 Continents, The New York Times, 3 January 1989.

1906 births
1988 deaths
Conservative Party (UK) MPs for English constituencies
Graduates of the Royal Military College, Sandhurst
Irish Guards officers
Royal Air Force officers
Loel Guinness
UK MPs 1931–1935
UK MPs 1935–1945
English bankers
British socialites
Royal Air Force personnel of World War II
English aviators
Officers of the Order of the British Empire
Commanders of the Order of Orange-Nassau
Officiers of the Légion d'honneur
Recipients of the Croix de Guerre 1939–1945 (France)
Politics of Bath, Somerset
Politicians from New York City
20th-century English businesspeople